Virginie Razzano was the defending champion, but chose not to participate that year.

Vera Zvonareva won the title, defeating Peng Shuai in the final 6–7(4–7), 6–0, 6–2.

Seeds

  Vera Zvonareva (champion)
  Patty Schnyder  (withdrew due to a back injury)
  Zheng Jie (semifinals)
  Peng Shuai (final)
  Gisela Dulko (second round)
  Olga Govortsova (second round)
  Pauline Parmentier (second round)
  Mariya Koryttseva (second round)
  Marta Domachowska (withdrew due to a viral illness)

Draw

Finals

Top half

Bottom half

External links 
 Draw and Qualifying draw

2008 Singles
Guangzhou International Women's Open